Sakuya Tachibana may to:

 Sakuya Tachibana, a character in the tokusatsu television series Kamen Rider Blade
 Sakuya Tachibana, a character in the video game God Eater